Tania Lombrozo is an American psychologist who is the Arthur W. Marks Professor of Psychology at Princeton University. She oversees the Concepts and Cognition Laboratory, which looks to understand the science that underpins cognition.

Early life and education 
Lombrozo is from the United States. She was an undergraduate student at Stanford University, where she earned an undergraduate degree in Symbolic Systems and Philosophy. During her undergraduate research, she worked with Peter Godfrey-Smith on the philosophy of science. She moved to Harvard University as a Master's student in psychology and stayed for a doctorate in psychology under the supervision of Susan Carey. Her thesis explored explanation and causal knowledge.

Research and career 
In 2006 Lombrozo joined University of California, Berkeley as an Assistant Professor. She was made the Class of 1944 Chair in the Department of Psychology in 2017.

Lombrozo was made the Arthur W. Marks Professor of Psychology at Princeton University in 2019. Her research looks to understand cognition. She is particularly interested in explanation and understanding, as well as folk epistemology. 

She was a frequent contributor to NPR, where she wrote on psychology and cognitive science. She is a contributor to Psychology Today. She has worked with the Association for Psychological Science (APS) to better engage the public in psychological research.

Awards and honors 
 2010 Society for Philosophy and Psychology Stanton Prize
 2012 American Psychological Association Janet Taylor Spence Award
 2014 Society of Experimental Psychologists Early Investigator Award
 American Psychological Association Distinguished Scientific Award
 2018 National Science Foundation CAREER Award
 2019 Foundation Scholar Award in Understanding Human Cognition
 2020 American Psychological Foundation Joseph B. Gittler Award

Selected publications

Personal life 
Lombrozo is married to fellow Princeton psychology professor Tom Griffiths.

References 

Stanford University alumni
Harvard University alumni
Princeton University faculty
University of California, Berkeley faculty
Year of birth missing (living people)
Living people
American cognitive psychologists
American women psychologists